The 1989 World Junior Figure Skating Championships were held from November 29 to December 4, 1988 in Sarajevo, SR Bosnia and Herzegovina, SFR Yugoslavia. The event was sanctioned by the International Skating Union and open to ISU member nations. Medals were awarded in the disciplines of men's singles, ladies' singles, pair skating, and ice dancing.

Results

Men

Ladies

Pairs

Ice dancing

References

1989
1988 in figure skating
International figure skating competitions hosted by Yugoslavia
November 1988 sports events in Europe
December 1988 sports events in Europe
Sports competitions in Sarajevo
1989 World Junior Figure Skating Championships
1988 in Yugoslav sport
1988 in Bosnia and Herzegovina